Nial R. Hysell (10 October 1854 – 21 October 1921) was a politician from the U.S. State of Ohio who served as Speaker of the Ohio House of Representatives from 1890 to 1892.

Biography
Nial R. Hysell was born October 10, 1854 at Pomeroy, Ohio. After a few months of school he began working in a coal mine as a boy. He studied in his leisure hours, and acquired some education. He worked as a coal miner until 1884. In 1884, Hysell was elected vice-president of the miner's organization, serving for three years. He then was president of the state trade assembly for three years. He represented Perry County in the Ohio House of Representatives from 1888 to 1892 as a Democrat, and was Speaker of the House 1890 to 1892. He then read law and was admitted to the bar in 1893. He was elected to the Ohio State Senate for the tenth district, Franklin & Pickaway counties, from 1896 to 1898 after moving to Columbus.

Personal
Hysell married Analda R. Dining in 1875.

References

Bibliography

1854 births
American coal miners
Ohio lawyers
Democratic Party Ohio state senators
Politicians from Columbus, Ohio
People from Perry County, Ohio
People from Pomeroy, Ohio
Speakers of the Ohio House of Representatives
Democratic Party members of the Ohio House of Representatives
1921 deaths
Lawyers from Columbus, Ohio
19th-century American lawyers